The Dawn Staley Community Leadership Award is an annual Women's National Basketball Association (WNBA) award given since the league's 2008 season, that recognizes a player who is an inspiration in her community and reflects Dawn Staley’s leadership, spirit, charitable efforts and love for the game. This is the same criterion used by the analogous NBA Community Assist Award, given by the NBA since its 2001-02 season. However, this award is distinct from the WNBA Community Assist Award, first presented on a monthly basis in 2009 with a season-long award added in 2019.

Every year, each of the WNBA teams nominates one of its players to compete for this award. From these nominees, a designated committee  vote for the winner and the WNBA donates $10,000 to a charity that the player chooses on their behalf.

Winners

See also

 List of sports awards honoring women

References

Awards established in 2007
Dawn